Trigonocyttara clandestina is a moth in the Psychidae family, and the only species in the genus Trigonocyttara. It is found in Australia, where it has been recorded from southern Queensland to Victoria.

They create a cylindrical larval case, with one or two twigs attached to it.

References

Natural History Museum Lepidoptera generic names catalog

Psychidae
Moths described in 1945